Two human polls comprise the 1995–96 NCAA Division I women's basketball rankings, the AP Poll and the Coaches Poll, in addition to various publications' preseason polls. The AP poll is currently a poll of sportswriters, while the USA Today Coaches' Poll is a poll of college coaches. The AP conducts polls weekly through the end of the regular season and conference play, while the Coaches poll conducts a final, post-NCAA tournament poll as well.

Legend

AP Poll
Source

USA Today Coaches poll
Source

References

1995–96 NCAA Division I women's basketball season
College women's basketball rankings in the United States